Qeshlaq-e Jonubi Rural District is in Qeshlaq Dasht District of Bileh Savar County, Ardabil province, Iran. At the census of 2006, its population was 6,859 in 1,471 households; there were 5,582 inhabitants in 1,472 households at the following census of 2011; and in the most recent census of 2016, the population of the rural district was 4,868 in 1,430 households. The largest of its 121 villages was Shur Gol, with 405 people.

References 

Bileh Savar County

Rural Districts of Ardabil Province

Populated places in Ardabil Province

Populated places in Bileh Savar County